Hieronymiella is a genus of South American plants in the Amaryllis family, known from only Bolivia and Argentina.

Recognized species

References

Amaryllidaceae genera